Brownfield is an unincorporated community in northeastern Laclede County, in the U.S. state of Missouri. The community is located just over one mile southeast of the Laclede-Pulaski county line and one mile east of Missouri Route K. It is within the Mark Twain National Forest and the Gasconade River lies just one mile to the east.

History
A post office called Brownfield was established in 1930, and remained in operation until 1955. Riley Brownfield, an early postmaster, gave the community his last name.

References

Unincorporated communities in Laclede County, Missouri
Unincorporated communities in Missouri